De Salaberry is a rural municipality in the province of Manitoba in western Canada. The administratively separate village of St-Pierre-Jolys and St. Malo Provincial Park lie within the geographical borders of the municipality. The municipality is named after Charles de Salaberry.

Communities
 Carey
 Dufrost
 La Rochelle
 Otterburne
 St. Malo

Demographics 

References 

 Manitoba Historical Society - Rural Municipality of De Salaberry
 Map of De Salaberry R.M. at Statcan

External links
 

Rural municipalities in Manitoba